Zetea is a commune in the central part of Harghita County, Romania. The commune lies in the Székely Land, an ethno-cultural region in eastern Transylvania.

Component villages
The commune is composed of six villages:

Geography

The commune lies on the banks of the Târnava Mare river. The Vărșag is a left tributary of this river; it flows into the Târnava Mare near the Poiana Târnavei village.

Demographics
The commune has an absolute Székely Hungarian majority. According to the 2011 census it had a population of 5,643 of which 96.72% or 5,721 were ethnic Hungarians and 1.19% were ethnic Romani.

Natives
  (1895–1953), Franciscan monk, writer, victim of the Communist regime
 Ludwig Schneider (b. 1968), German wrestler

See also
Dacian fortress of Zetea

References

External links
 https://zetelaka.ro/zetelaka
 https://zetelaka.ro/zetea

Communes in Harghita County
Localities in Transylvania